Magic of Eberron is a supplement to the 3.5 edition of the Dungeons & Dragons role-playing game.

Contents
Magic of Eberron is an accessory for the Eberron setting that exposes the magic and eldritch wonders of Eberron. In addition to presenting new arcane and divine spells, feats, prestige classes, and magic items, Magic of Eberron offers new options and infusions for artificers, explores dragon totem magic and the twisted experiments of the daelkyr, sheds light on the process of elemental binding, and touches on other types of magic present in the world.

Publication history
Magic of Eberron was written by Bruce R. Cordell, Stephen Schubert, and Chris Thomasson, and published in October 2005. Cover art was by Wayne Reynolds, with interior art by Anne Stokes, David Michael Beck, Draxhall Jump Entertainment, Eric Deschamps, Francis Tsai, Lucio Parrillo, Mark Tedin, Steve Prescott, and Tomas Giorello.

Reception

External links
Product info

References

Eberron supplements
Role-playing game supplements introduced in 2005